N'Gaous District is a daïra in the Batna wilaya of Algeria, whose administrative center is the commune of the same name.

Location 
The daïra is located near the center of the wilaya.

Municipalities
The district further divides into three municipalities.
N'Gaous
Boumagueur
Sefiane

References

Districts of Batna Province
Algeria geography articles needing translation from French Wikipedia